Cambodia is a country located in the southern portion of the Indochinese Peninsula in Southeast Asia. The country is reported by various organisations to have numerous sociopolitical issues including widespread poverty (according to the World Bank), pervasive corruption (according to Freedom House), lack of political freedoms (according to Transparency International), low human development (according to the Human Development Report) and a high rate of hunger. Cambodia has been described by Human Rights Watch's Southeast Asian Director, David Roberts, as a "vaguely communist free-market state with a relatively authoritarian coalition ruling over a superficial democracy." While per capita income remains low compared to most neighbouring countries, Cambodia has one of the fastest growing economies in Asia, with growth averaging 6 percent over the last decade. Agriculture remains the dominant economic sector, with strong growth in textiles, construction, garments and tourism leading to increased foreign investment and international trade. In the World Justice Project's 2015 Rule of Law Index, Cambodia was ranked 99 out of 102 countries, the lowest in the region.

For further information on the types of business entities in this country and their abbreviations, see Business entities in Cambodia.

Notable firms 
This list includes notable companies with primary headquarters located in the country. The industry and sector follow the Industry Classification Benchmark taxonomy. Organizations which have ceased operations are included and noted as defunct.

See also 
 List of airlines of Cambodia

References 

Cambodia